Øivind may refer to:

Øivind Blunck (born 1950), Norwegian comedian and actor
Øivind Bolstad (1905–1979), Norwegian playwright and novelist
Øivind Farmen, Norwegian accordionist
Øivind Holmsen (1912–1996), Norwegian international footballer
Øivind Jensen (1905–1989), Norwegian boxer
Øivind Larsen (born 1938), Norwegian physician
Birger Øivind Meidell (1882–1958), Norwegian government minister
Øivind Tomteberget (born 1953), retired Norwegian football midfielder
Tor Øivind Ødegård (born 1969), retired Norwegian middle-distance runner

See also
Øyvind
Eivind

Norwegian masculine given names
Masculine given names